Sejdiu is an Albanian surname. Notable people with the surname include:

Bajrush Sejdiu (born 1968), Macedonian criminal of Albanian descent 
Dardan Sejdiu (born 1979), Deputy Mayor of Pristina, the capital of Kosovo
Fatmir Sejdiu (born 1951), Kosovar politician and President of Kosovo
Florent Sejdiu (born 1990), Albanian football player
Shaban Sejdiu (born 1959), Macedonian Albanian sport wrestler

Albanian-language surnames